Bimbaki (also Romanized as Bīmbakī; also known as Dīmbakī) is a village in Jakdan Rural District, in the Central District of Bashagard County, Hormozgan Province, Iran. At the 2006 census, its population was 49, in 7 families.

References 

Populated places in Bashagard County